Fellsburg is a census-designated place located in Rostraver Township, Westmoreland County in the state of Pennsylvania, United States.  It is home to the Fells Church, overlooking the Monongahela and Youhgiogheny Valleys.  As of the 2010 census the population was 1,180 residents.

Demographics

References

Census-designated places in Westmoreland County, Pennsylvania
Census-designated places in Pennsylvania